Interstate 385 (I-385) is an auxiliary Interstate Highway located in the Upstate region of South Carolina. I-385 is a spur route of I-85. The highway provides a connection between Greenville and I-26 to the south, connecting Greenville to Columbia and Charleston. Around Greenville, the last several miles of I-385 forms the northeastern quadrant of a partial beltway around Greenville's southern suburbs along with I-185.

Route description

After exit 42, I-385 turns into I-385 Business (I-385 Bus.) and becomes East North Street and later—for northbound motorists only—Beattie Place. The business route promptly ends at US Highway 29 (US 29; Church Street) near Bon Secours Wellness Arena in downtown Greenville.

The explosive economic growth of southern Greenville county is largely attributed to I-385 and its connection to the city of Greenville and the major cities of Atlanta and Charlotte (via I-85). This area is known by locals as the "Golden Strip".

I-385 features a rather unusual rest area in the median strip near Laurens that serves both directions of traffic. It was completed as part of the original design of the US 276 expressway in 1958, modeled after the type of single median-located rest areas shared by both north and southbound traffic (to save money). The design is similar to many of those built on turnpikes that predated the Interstate System.

History

The general idea—but none of the specifics—of I-385 were present on the 1955 Yellow Book map of the Greenville area. Also of note is that I-85 would have used the US 29 corridor from Greenville east toward Spartanburg based on the diagram.

The portion of I-385 that replaced US 276 (from South Carolina Highway 417 [SC 417] in Mauldin to SC 56/I-26 in Clinton) was initially the first phase built of a South Carolina Department of Transportation (SCDOT) plan that predated the Interstate System to upgrade and bypass existing through routes, the goal of forming a single limited-access highway from Greenville to the port of Charleston via the state capital of Columbia. This plan was scrapped as soon as the future I-26 was added to the act of Congress that set into motion the Interstate System. As a result, I-26 was one of the first Interstates in the south to open in significant mileage (most in South Carolina between 1959 and 1963).

Before 1985, I-385 was only signed as such from downtown Greenville to I-85. The portion of the freeway from US 276 in Mauldin to the southern terminus at I-26 was signed as US 276. When the connecting portion was completed, the entire freeway was signed as I-385.

For seven months ending July 23, 2010, northbound traffic could not use a  section of I-385 in Laurens County due to a $60.9-million (equivalent to $ in ) project to pave the portion extending from SC 101 to the I-385/I-26 interchange near Clinton in concrete. The closing of a major highway generated controversy. Closing the Interstate for construction saved approximately $34 million (equivalent to $ in ).

Between 2002 and 2012, I-385 was widened from two to three lanes in each direction from just north of exit 24 near Fountain Inn to just south of Woodruff Road/SC 146 (exit 35), with the portion between exits 31 and 35 resurfaced in concrete.

Starting in February 2016 and expected to continue through 2020, the I-385/I-85 interchange is being reconstructed to decrease congestion and related accidents.

Exit list

Interstate 385 Business

Interstate 385 Business (I-385 Bus.) is a  boulevard-grade business route of I-385 along North Street, between Stone Avenue (US 276) and Church Street (US 29). It is an unsigned highway. Its continuation along North Street becomes SC 183. It also connects to US 123 (Academy Street) and SC 183 (Beattie Place). Signage previously existed for this spur route but, by 2007, has been removed; appears only in the SCDOT Greenville–Spartanburg Metro map.

See also

References

External links

Mapmikey's South Carolina Highways Page: I-385

85-3
85-3
3
Transportation in Laurens County, South Carolina
Transportation in Greenville County, South Carolina